Geoffrey Willis Sadler (1943-2005), was an English novelist, essayist and editor, most famous for his vast output of western novels published under the pen name Jeff Sadler.

Life
Geoffrey Willis Sadler was born on 7 October 1943 in Mansfield Woodhouse, Nottinghamshire. He started work as a library assistant in 1960 and worked as a librarian at Staveley, Shirebrook, Bolsover, and Chesterfield, where he remained for nineteen years. He was a prolific writer of local history books on Shirebrook and Chesterfield, as well as an editor, although the largest part of his work is made of western novels.

Sadler married in 1965 and had two sons. He died in Chesterfield in 2005, after a two-year battle with motor neurone disease.

Work

Work as editor
Sadler as editor to the second edition of Twentieth Century Western Writers, a comprehensive index listing 467 authors of western fiction. In their review, Library Journal lauded the effort in adding many female names to the previous edition (such as Jessamyn West, Rose Wilder Lane, and Bess Streeter Aldrich), "evidence of the contributors' stated revisionist attitude toward the history of the American Western novel".

Outside the western genre
In 1982, Sadler penned the "Justus" trilogy of novels, dealing with the life of the eponymous slave. These novels were signed under his birth name, Geoffrey Sadler, and published by New English Library.

Starting in the 1990s Sadler became a prolific writer of local history books on Shirebrook and Chesterfield, such as two volumes of Foul Deeds and Suspicious Deaths in and Around Chesterfield. He grew interested in local crime through his job at Chesterfield Local Studies Library.

As an essayist, Sadler wrote on poets Ruth Fainlight and Daniel Weissbort, and was a contributor to The Routledge Encyclopedia of Jewish Writers of the Twentieth Century and Twentieth-Century Romance and Gothic Writers.

Bibliography

Westerns

As Jeff Sadler

As Wes Calhoun

Other genres
 The Lash (1982) (Justus #1)
 Bloodwater (1982) (Justus #2)
 Black Vengeance (1982) (Justus #3)

Non-Fiction

References

1943 births
2005 deaths
People from Mansfield District
English writers
Western (genre) writers